Dysphoria is a profound state of unease or dissatisfaction. It is the semantic opposite of euphoria. In a psychiatric context, dysphoria may accompany depression, anxiety, or agitation.

In psychiatry
Intense states of distress and unease increase the risk of suicide, as well as being unpleasant in themselves. Relieving dysphoria is therefore a priority of psychiatric treatment. One may treat underlying causes such as depression or bipolar disorder as well as the dysphoric symptoms themselves. 

The Diagnostic and Statistical Manual of Mental Disorders (DSM-5) categorizes specific dysphoria in the obsessive–compulsive spectrum.

Dissatisfaction with being able-bodied can be diagnosed as body integrity dysphoria in the ICD-11.

Gender dysphoria

Gender dysphoria is discomfort, unhappiness or distress due to the primary sex characteristics and secondary sex characteristics of one's sex assigned at birth. The current edition of the Diagnostic and Statistical Manual of Mental Disorders, DSM-5, uses the term "gender dysphoria" where it previously referred to "gender identity disorder", making it clear that they no longer consider the gender identity to be disordered, but rather the emotional state of distress which results from the gender identity.

Related conditions
The following conditions may include dysphoria as a symptom:

Major depressive disorder (unipolar) and dysthymia
Bipolar disorder and cyclothymia
Borderline personality disorder
Premenstrual syndrome
Premenstrual dysphoric disorder
Dysphoric milk ejection reflex
Stress
Adjustment disorder with depressed mood
Anxiety disorders such as post-traumatic stress disorder
Dysphoric rumination
Dissociative disorders such as dissociative identity disorder, dissociative amnesia and depersonalization disorder.
Attention deficit hyperactivity disorder, defined as emotional deregulation or unbearable RSD "rejection sensitivity dysphoria"
Mixed anxiety-depressive disorder
Gender dysphoria
Personality disorders such as borderline personality disorder, dependent personality disorder and antisocial personality disorder
Substance withdrawal
Body dysmorphic disorder
Akathisia
Hypoglycemia
Schizophrenia
Sexual dysfunction
Body integrity dysphoria
Insomnia
Chronic pain

Drug-induced (dysphoriants)
Some drugs can produce dysphoria, including κ-opioid receptor agonists like salvinorin A (the active constituent of the hallucinogenic plant Salvia divinorum), butorphanol and pentazocine, μ-opioid receptor antagonists such as naltrexone and nalmefene, and antipsychotics like haloperidol and chlorpromazine (via blockade of dopamine receptors), among others. Depressogenic and/or anxiogenic drugs may also be associated with dysphoria.

In popular culture
Against Me! released the album Transgender Dysphoria Blues in which the lead singer Laura Jane Grace shares her experiences of gender dysphoria.

Shane Neilson released a book of poetry entitled Dysphoria (Erin, ON: The Porcupine's Quill, 2017) in which he explores the experience of dysphoria.

References

External links

"Dysphoria." Alleydog.com Psychology Glossary.

Emotions
Mood disorders
Mental states